The Ministry of Information and Communications was a central executive body of the Government of Kazakhstan. On 5 May 2016, President Nursultan Nazarbayev ordered the creation of the new Ministry in response to the 2016 Kazakh protests which was established the following day on 6 May. The Ministry was headed by Presidential Press Secretary Dauren Abaev. The head of the department was introduced to the team by the Prime Minister Karim Massimov.

The Ministry was dissolved on 25 February 2019, and all its functions were transferred to the Ministry of Information and Social Development.

History 
May 5, 2016 President Nursultan Nazarbayev instructed to create the Ministry of Information and Communications.

The ministry was created the next day, on May 6. The ministry headed the press secretary of President Abaev Dauren Askerbekovich. The head of the department introduced the team of Prime Minister RK Karim Masimov.

References

2016 establishments in Kazakhstan
Information and Communications
Ministries established in 2016